María del Consuelo de Fátima Rodríguez Píriz (1960 – 22 February 2021) was a Spanish politician from the conservative People's Party and member of the Assembly of Extremadura between 2011 and her death in 2021.

Biography
Rodríguez was born in Olivenza in 1960, province of Badajoz and got a degree in Psychology from the University of Granada and a diploma in Hearing and Language from the University of Extremadura. Between 1999 and 2011 she was city councilor of Badajoz, occupying the departments of Culture, Fairs and Festivals. In the 2011 Extremaduran regional election she got elected deputy of the Assembly of Extremadura, office she held until her death. She was also the first vice president of the Autonomous Chamber between 2011 and 2015.

At the end of January 2021, she was admitted to the Badajoz University Hospital affected by COVID-19 during the COVID-19 pandemic in Spain. She died three weeks later on 22 February, at the age of 60, being the first Spanish legislator in office to die from the virus.

References

1960 births
2021 deaths
21st-century Spanish women politicians
Politicians from Extremadura
People from Olivenza
University of Granada alumni
University of Extremadura alumni
Members of the 8th Assembly of Extremadura
Members of the 9th Assembly of Extremadura
Members of the 10th Assembly of Extremadura
People's Party (Spain) politicians
Deaths from the COVID-19 pandemic in Spain